In this first edition of the annual Kremlin Cup tennis competition, the doubles category winners were H. J. Davids and P. Haarhuis with winning scores of 6-4 and 7-6. This team became the first winner of the Kremlin Cup for doubles.

Seeds

Draw

Draw

External links
Draw

Kremlin Cup
Kremlin Cup